Cecil Township may refer to:

Cecil Township, Haywood County, North Carolina, in Haywood County, North Carolina
Cecil Township, Bottineau County, North Dakota
Cecil Township, Washington County, Pennsylvania

Township name disambiguation pages